Bourdeau is a commune situated in the Savoie department and in the Auvergne-Rhône-Alpes region, in south-eastern France. It is part of the urban area of Chambéry.

See also
Communes of the Savoie department

References

Communes of Savoie